James Stanhope may refer to:

 James Stanhope, 1st Earl Stanhope (c. 1673–1721), British statesman and soldier
 James Stanhope, 7th Earl Stanhope (1880–1967), British politician
James Hamilton Stanhope (1788–1825), British soldier and MP
James Stanhope (MP) (1821–1904), Member of Parliament for North Lincolnshire, 1852–1868